Carl Naibo (born 17 August 1982 in Villeneuve-sur-Lot) is a French former professional road bicycle racer. He was tested positive to EPO in 2011 when he was riding for the amateur team of Montauban (US Montauban). Then, he was suspended for two years by French cycling federation.

Major results 

2005
 1st  Overall Tour de l'Ain
1st Stage 3
 1st Stage 9 Tour de l'Avenir
 2nd Paris–Troyes
 6th Overall Route du Sud
2006
 1st  Mountains classification Paris–Corrèze
2008
 4th Overall Boucle de l'Artois
 5th Overall Rhône-Alpes Isère Tour
 9th Grand Prix Cristal Energie
2010
 1st Tour du Tarn-et-Garonne

External links 
 

French male cyclists
1982 births
Living people
People from Villeneuve-sur-Lot
Sportspeople from Lot-et-Garonne
Cyclists from Nouvelle-Aquitaine